Lavagh may refer to one of several populated places in the Republic of Ireland:

Lavagh, County Cavan
Lavagh, County Galway
Lavagh (Drumahaire barony), County Leitrim
Lavagh (Leitrim barony), County Leitrim
Lavagh, County Offaly
Lavagh, County Roscommon
Lavagh, (Leyny barony), County Sligo
Lavagh, (Tireragh barony), County Sligo